SM U-112 was a Type U 93 submarine and one of the 329 submarines serving in the Imperial German Navy in World War I. 
U-112 was engaged in naval warfare and took part in the First Battle of the Atlantic.
 She was surrendered to the Allies at Harwich on 22 November 1918 and later transferred to Pembroke, earmarked for use in experiments. In the event, the boat was sold to M. Lynch and Son on 27 September 1920, and towed to Rochester, Kent, where the diesel engines were removed for use ashore. The hulk was re-sold to Upnor Shipbreaking on 25 October 1922 and broken up.

Design
German Type U 93 submarines were preceded by the shorter Type U 87 submarines. U-112 had a displacement of  when at the surface and  while submerged. The submarine was powered by two  engines for use while surfaced, and two  engines for use while submerged. She had two propeller shafts and two  propellers.

U-112 was fitted with six  torpedo tubes (four at the bow and two at the stern), twelve to sixteen torpedoes, one  SK L/45 deck gun, and one  SK L/30 deck gun. She had a complement of thirty-six (thirty-two crew members and four officers).

References

Notes

Citations

Bibliography

World War I submarines of Germany
German Type U 93 submarines
Ships built in Kiel
1917 ships
U-boats commissioned in 1918